"Sharp Dressed Man" is a song by American rock band ZZ Top, released on their 1983 album Eliminator.  The song was produced by band manager Bill Ham, and recorded and mixed by Terry Manning. Pre-production recording engineer Linden Hudson was very involved in the early stages of this song's production.

Composition
The guitar solo in the song was chosen by Guitar World as number 43 in their 2009 list of the 50 Greatest Guitar Solos.

Appearances
At 2007's VH1 Rock Honors, Nickelback covered the song as a tribute (Billy Gibbons had earlier made a guest appearance on Nickelback's own songs "Rockstar" and "Follow You Home").

ZZ Top played this song at halftime of the 2008 Orange Bowl college football bowl game.

In 2012 the song was chosen to be the opening theme song for the A&E reality show Duck Dynasty. The show ran on A&E from 2012 until 2017.

In 2020, the song reentered the Billboard charts following the release of the documentary ZZ Top: That Little Ol' Band from Texas.

Music video
The "Sharp Dressed Man" music video continues the story of the "Gimme All Your Lovin'" video, and forms a loose trilogy ending with the video for "Legs". In the video, a male parking valet is remade as a star by a trio of women driving up in the Eliminator car; the band grants him the keys to the car.

The video was directed by Tim Newman, who had also directed the video for "Gimme All Your Lovin'". Warner Bros. Records record executive Jeff Ayeroff said that Warner did not want to do a second video, but he convinced them to pay more money for the "Sharp Dressed Man" video. Newman said, "When they asked me to do another one, the idea that you would do a sequel in a form that isn't even a form struck me as funny, in a very insidery way." He said that a beer company, likely Schlitz, secretly paid Warner for a product placement in the video, but MTV refused to air it until the shots were removed. After this damaged his reputation, Newman told Warner he would no longer direct their videos. After negotiating, he returned to direct the video for "Legs".

Charts

Year-end charts

Personnel 
 Billy Gibbons – vocals, lead and rhythm guitars
 Dusty Hill – bass, keyboards
 Frank Beard – drums
 Linden Hudson – preproduction engineer
 Terry Manning – engineer

References 

1983 singles
ZZ Top songs
Songs written by Frank Beard (musician)
Songs written by Dusty Hill
Songs written by Billy Gibbons
Brad Paisley songs
Warner Records singles
1983 songs
MTV Video Music Award for Best Direction
Song recordings produced by Bill Ham